Chorense e Monte (officially, União das Freguesias de Chorense e Monte) is a Portuguese freguesia ("civil parish"), located in the municipality of Terras de Bouro in the district of Braga. The population in 2011 was 580, in an area of 20.26 km2.

History 
It was formed in 2013, under a national administrative reform, by the aggregation of the former parishes of Chorense and Monte.

References 

Parishes of Terras de Bouro